Monteith is an unincorporated community in Guthrie County, Iowa, United States.

History 
Monteith got its start in the year 1881, following construction of the railroad through the territory. Monteith's population was 57 in 1902, and 78 in 1925.

References 

Unincorporated communities in Iowa
Unincorporated communities in Guthrie County, Iowa
1881 establishments in Iowa